Betty Boop and Felix is a newspaper comic strip starring Betty Boop and Felix the Cat, which ran from November 19, 1984, to January 31, 1988. It was written by Mort Walker’s sons Brian, Morgan, Greg and Neal, who signed their work as “The Walker Brothers.”

Debuting at the height of Garfield’s popularity, this King Features Syndicate strip showed Betty Boop as a working woman and Felix as her pet (replacing Pudgy as Betty's pet). Unlike most other incarnations of the famous cat, Felix never spoke in this strip; his ideas and opinions are conveyed to the reader in thought balloons. Also, Felix's squash and stretch abilities and magic bag are absent, and Betty's sex appeal is downplayed.

References

External links
Balloons

Betty Boop
1984 comics debuts
Gag-a-day comics
1988 comics endings
Crossover comics
Felix the Cat
Comics based on films
Comic strip duos
Comics about women